Monasterolo may refer to several places in Italy:

Monasterolo Casotto, a municipality in the Province of Cuneo, Piedmont
Monasterolo del Castello, a municipality in the Province of Bergamo, Lombardy
Monasterolo di Savigliano, a municipality in the Province of Cuneo, Piedmont
Monasterolo Torinese, a civil parish (frazione) of Cafasse (TO), Piedmont
Castle of Monasterolo, a castle in Monasterolo del Castello (BG), Lombardy

See also
Monastero (disambiguation)